Gebel Kamil is a meteorite that struck Egypt about 5000 years ago leaving a crater surrounded by thousands of pieces of iron shrapnel with a total weight of about .

History
About  was recovered. The geophysical survey took place as part of the "2009 Italian-Egyptian Year of Science and Technology".

Mineralogy

The Gebel Kamil meteorite contains the minerals schreibersite and kamacite.

Classification
The Gebel Kamil meteorite has been classified as an ataxite.

See also
 2008 TC3
 Glossary of meteoritics

References

Meteorites found in Egypt